Hawk Mountain Sanctuary is a wild bird sanctuary in Albany Township and East Brunswick Township, located along the Appalachian flyway in eastern Pennsylvania. The sanctuary is a prime location for the viewing of kettling and migrating raptors, known as hawkwatching, with an average of 20,000 hawks, eagles and falcons passing the lookouts during the late summer and fall every year. The birds are identified and counted by staff and volunteers to produce annual counts of migrating raptors that represent the world's longest record of raptor populations. These counts have provided conservationists with valuable information on changes in raptor numbers in North America.

The property was listed on the National Register of Historic Places in 2022.

Setting
The Sanctuary is located on a ridge of Hawk Mountain, one of the Blue Mountain chain. The Visitor Center houses a shop and facilities with parking nearby. A habitat garden next to it is home to native plants that are protected by a deer fence. Nine trails of varying difficulty are available to hikers and linked to the Appalachian Trail.

Located in the sanctuary is Schaumboch's Tavern, listed on the National Register of Historic Places in 1979.

History 
The area was a popular site for shooting hawks, either for sport or to prevent depredations on domestic fowl or game birds. In 1934, Rosalie Edge leased  of property on Hawk Mountain and hired wardens to keep the hunters away. The wardens were Maurice Broun and his wife Irma Broun, bird enthusiasts and conservationists from New England. Almost immediately, there was a noticeable recovery in the raptor population. In 1938, the Hawk Mountain Sanctuary Association was incorporated as a non-profit organization in Pennsylvania, and Edge purchased the property and deeded it to the association in perpetuity.

In 1965, the sanctuary was designated a National Natural Landmark, and in 2022 it was listed on the National Register of Historic Places.

Famous visitors to the sanctuary include Rachel Carson.

Through Sarkis Acopian's philanthropy, the sanctuary was able to open the Acopian Center for Conservation Learning in 2001, where students come from all over the world to participate in work-study internships, learning about ornithology, environmental science, biology, and related fields.

Migration timetable
The peak migration time at Hawk Mountain Sanctuary varies among the various species. Time periods given here are those when the raptor has historically been counted on half or more days. Species of raptor are listed in chronological order of the start of their period of likely observation.

 Broad-winged hawk: late August to late September
 American kestrel: late August to early October
 Osprey: late August to early October
 Bald eagle: early September
 Northern harrier: early September to early November
 Sharp-shinned hawk: early September to early November
 Red-tailed hawk: early September to early December
 Cooper's hawk: late September to late October
 Merlin: early October
 Peregrine falcon: early October 
 Red-shouldered hawk: early October to early November
 Golden eagle: early November
 Rough-legged hawk: early November to early December
 Goshawk: late November

Gallery

References

External links

 The official website of Hawk Mountain

Bird sanctuaries of the United States
Raptor organizations
National Natural Landmarks in Pennsylvania
Bird observatories in the United States
Protected areas of Berks County, Pennsylvania
Nature reserves in Pennsylvania
Protected areas of Schuylkill County, Pennsylvania
Schuylkill River National and State Heritage Area
Nature centers in Pennsylvania
Raptor migration sites
National Register of Historic Places in Berks County, Pennsylvania